San Enrique may refer to:

San Enrique, Iloilo, Philippines
San Enrique, Negros Occidental, Philippines
San Enrique, Buenos Aires, a settlement in Veinticinco de Mayo Partido, Buenos Aires Province, Argentina
San Enrique, Lo Barnechea, a neighborhood of Lo Barnechea, Chile